Batagolla is a village in Sri Lanka. It is located within Central Province. It is where people made groups against British

See also
List of towns in Central Province, Sri Lanka

External links

Populated places in Nuwara Eliya District